Eriogonum breedlovei is a rare species of wild buckwheat known by the common name Paiute buckwheat. It is endemic to the High Sierra Nevada of California, where its two varieties are uncommon members of the flora in granite and limestone rocky high mountain habitat.

Description
Eriogonum breedlovei is a perennial herb forming low mats of spreading stems lined with woolly oval leaves no longer than about a centimeter. The inflorescence is a cluster of tiny white to reddish, hairy flowers.

Varieties 
Both varieties of this species are rare: 
var. breedlovei, Breedlove's buckwheat, is endemic to the Piute Mountains of Kern County, California, where only a few occurrences are known.
var. shevockii, Shevock's buckwheat or The Needles buckwheat, can be found on a few Sierra peaks, including The Needles, in Kern and Tulare Counties.

External links
Jepson Manual Treatment - Eriogonum breedlovei

breedlovei
Endemic flora of California
Flora of the Sierra Nevada (United States)
Flora without expected TNC conservation status